"Ship of Fools" is a song by British synth-pop duo Erasure, released in February 1988 as the lead single from their third studio album, The Innocents (1988). The song was written by Vince Clarke and Andy Bell, and produced by Stephen Hague and Dave Jacob. It peaked at number six on the UK Singles Chart, and was the duo's eighth single overall and their fourth UK Top 10 single.

Critical reception
Colin Irwin from Number One wrote, "Memorable in a tooth-achey kind of way and not a patch on 'Circus' which was at least disguised in brightness an light. And Andy Bell still sounds exactly like Alison Moyet." Eleanor Levy of Record Mirror described "Ship of Fools" as Erasure "at their most open, melodic and beautiful". She added, "If there's one voice guaranteed to make the old erogenous zones come over all a-quiver it's Andy Bell's when he gets all throaty and emotional like this." Ro Newton from Smash Hits named it Single of the Fortnight, writing, "'Ship of Fools' is first and foremost a song, not a load of sterile bumps and clicks cobbed together in the way that some of the records on the charts are at the moment. It also happens to be very soothing with the quavery tones of Andy Bell fluttering away softly while Vince Clarke provides a strong orchestral backing with loads of swirly strings and other "subtle" things. I actually think this is rather wonderful and just the thing for the more sensitive souls among us to sip our Horlicks to!"

Retrospective response
In an 2007 review, the Daily Vault's Michael R. Smith commented, "My only complaint about "Ship Of Fools" is that Andy chooses to sing in a lower register. Whenever he does this, it makes the song sound like a warped record; his voice was always as its best in the more comfortable range of falsetto." In 2014, Chris Gerard from Metro Weekly described it as a "dramatic ballad" that showed a completely different side of Erasure. He also noted that it featured Andy Bell's "finest vocal yet", and "showed significant artistic growth for the duo."

Music video
A music video was filmed to promote the single, directed by Phillip Vile.

Track listings

 7" single (MUTE74)
 "Ship of Fools"
 "When I Needed You"

 12" single (12MUTE74)
 "Ship of Fools" (Shiver Me Timbers Mix)
 "River Deep, Mountain High" (Warm Depths Mix)
 "When I Needed You" (Melancholic Mix)

 Limited 12" single (L12MUTE74)
 "Ship of Fools" (RC Mix)
 "River Deep, Mountain High" (Private Dance Mix)
 "When I Needed You"

 CD single (CDMUTE74)
 "Ship of Fools" (Shiver Me Timbers Mix)
 "When I Needed You" (Melancholic Mix)
 "River Deep, Mountain High" (Private Dance Mix)

Charts

References

1988 songs
1988 singles
Erasure songs
Songs written by Vince Clarke
Songs written by Andy Bell (singer)
Mute Records singles
Song recordings produced by Stephen Hague
UK Independent Singles Chart number-one singles